The 1972–73 season was Kilmarnock’s 71st in Scottish League Competitions. They were relegated at the end of the season for the first time since 1947.

Scottish First Division

Scottish League Cup

Group stage

Group 4 final table

Scottish Cup

Texaco Cup

See also
List of Kilmarnock F.C. seasons

References

External links
https://www.fitbastats.com/kilmarnock/team_results_season.php

Kilmarnock F.C. seasons